Stephen Francis Sharkey (December 30, 1918 – March 15, 1995) was an American professional basketball player. He played for the Sheboygan Red Skins and Syracuse Nationals in the National Basketball League, where he averaged 4.2 points per game in 120 appearances.

References

1918 births
1995 deaths
American men's basketball players
Basketball players from New York (state)
Forwards (basketball)
Guards (basketball)
Sheboygan Red Skins players
Sportspeople from Schenectady, New York
Syracuse Nationals players